is a district located in Fukui Prefecture, Japan. The district was formed on March 31, 2005 at the same time as the merger of the towns of Mikata (from Mikata District) and Kaminaka (from Onyū District) forming the town of Wakasa.

As of October 1, 2005, the district has an estimated population of 16,782 and a density of 93.94 persons per km2. The total area is 178.65 km2.

Towns and villages
Wakasa

Districts in Fukui Prefecture